Wisconsin's 8th congressional district is a congressional district of the United States House of Representatives in northeastern Wisconsin. It is currently represented by Mike Gallagher, a Republican. Gallagher won the open seat vacated by Reid Ribble who retired in 2016. It is also one of two Congressional Districts to ever elect a Catholic priest, Robert John Cornell.

The 8th District has leaned Republican throughout its history; seven Democrats have represented it since its creation, but none have served more than two terms. It became more of a swing seat in the 1990s. In 2004, Republican George W. Bush won 55 percent of the vote in the district, while in 2008, Democrat Barack Obama received 53.6 percent of the vote. The last Democrat to represent the district was Steve Kagen from 2007 to 2011. Since Kagen lost in the 2010 election, the seat has been held by Republicans, who have consistently won it by double digit percent margins in each election to the seat since 2012, and won similarly in statewide elections. The only county in the current district to back the Democratic presidential candidate in the 2000, 2004 and 2016 elections was overwhelmingly Native American Menominee County, which has never voted Republican since its creation in 1960, and only Menominee and Door Counties voted Democratic in 2012.

Since the 1930 Census, the district has been centered upon Green Bay, Appleton and the Door Peninsula. Between the 1970 Census and the 2010 Census, the 8th moved north to encompass most counties bordering Michigan, but after 2010 it lost most of the border counties to the Seventh District, while gaining Calumet County.

Counties currently within the district include the entirety of Brown, Calumet, Door, Kewaunee, Marinette, Menominee, Oconto, Outagamie, Shawano, and Waupaca Counties, and part of Winnebago County.

Counties and municipalities within the district

Brown County
 Allouez, Ashwaubenon, Bellevue, Denmark, De Pere, Green Bay, Hobart, Howard, Pulaski

Calumet County
 Brillion, Chilton, Hilbert, Menasha, Potter, Sherwood, and Stockbridge.

Door County
 Baileys Harbor, Brussels, Clay Banks, Egg Harbor, Ephraim, Forestville, Gardner, Gibraltar, Jacksonsport, Liberty Grove, Nasewaupee, Sevastopol, Sister Bay, Sturgeon Bay, Union, and Washington Island.

Kewaunee County
 Algoma, Casco, Forestville, and Luxemburg.

Marinette County
 Coleman, Crivitz, Marinette, Niagara, Peshtigo, Pound, and Wausaukee.

Menominee County
 Menominee and Keshena.

Oconto County
 Gillett, Lena, Oconto, Oconto Falls, and Suring.

Outagamie County
 Appleton, Bear Creek, Black Creek, Combined Locks, Hortonville, Kaukauna, Kimberly, Little Chute, Nichols, Seymour, and Shiocton.

Shawano County
 Aniwa, Birnamwood, Bonduel, Bowler, Cecil, Eland, Gresham, Mattoon, Shawano, Tigerton, and Wittenberg.

Waupaca County
 Big Falls, Clintonville, Embarrass, Fremont, Iola, Manawa, Marion, New London, Ogdensburg, Scandinavia, Waupaca, and Weyauwega.

Winnebago County
 Clayton (part) and Winchester.

Presidential voting results

List of members representing the district

Recent election results

2002 district boundaries (2002–2011)

2011 district boundaries (2012–2021)

See also

Wisconsin's congressional districts
List of United States congressional districts

References

 Congressional Biographical Directory of the United States 1774–present

External links 
 Rep. Mike Gallagher's official House of Representatives website

08
Green Bay, Wisconsin
Appleton, Wisconsin